Judith Anne Blake is a computational biologist at the Jackson Laboratory and Professor of Mammalian Genetics.

Education
Blake completed her Bachelor of Arts degree in Biology in 1974 at the University of Connecticut. She moved to Harvard University for postgraduate study where she was awarded a Master of Arts degree in 1978 followed by a PhD in 1981. Her PhD investigated chromosomal variation in the Jamaican lizard Anolis grahami and was supervised by Ernest Edward Williams.

Career and research
Blake's research interests are in genome evolution, biomedical ontologies and mouse genetics. She is one of the leaders and founding principal investigators (PIs) of the Gene Ontology (GO) consortium and the Mouse Genome Database (MGD).

Awards and honors
Blake was elected a Fellow of the International Society for Computational Biology (ISCB) in 2020 for outstanding contributions to computational biology.

References

Living people
American bioinformaticians
Fellows of the International Society for Computational Biology
University of Connecticut faculty
Tufts University faculty
University of Maine faculty
University of Connecticut alumni
Harvard Graduate School of Arts and Sciences alumni
Year of birth missing (living people)
American women academics
21st-century American women scientists